Ceridwen or Cerridwen ( Ke-RID-wen) was an enchantress in Welsh medieval legend. She was the mother of a hideous son, Afagddu, and a beautiful daughter, Creirwy. Her husband was Tegid Foel and they lived near Bala Lake in north Wales. Medieval Welsh poetry refers to her as possessing the cauldron of poetic inspiration (Awen) and the Tale of Taliesin recounts her swallowing her servant Gwion Bach who is then reborn through her as the poet Taliesin. Ceridwen is regarded by many modern pagans as the Celtic goddess of rebirth, transformation, and inspiration.

Etymology
Marged Haycock catalogues various forms of the name in the early texts  and in less detail in her edition of the Taliesin poems These mainly occur in manuscripts which have been dated to the 13th century, though they may, of course, be using earlier forms or 13th century adaptations of earlier forms. The Black Book of Carmarthen gives ‘’. Peniarth 3  gives ‘’, The Book of Taliesin variously gives ‘’, ‘’ and ‘’, while The Red Book of Hergest gives ‘’. So ‘-fen’ is the most common termination (a mutated form of archaic ‘’ : ‘woman’). The variant forms ‘fen’, ‘uen’ and ‘ven’ are all due to variant scribal practices in the spelling of the sound in the modern letter ‘v’, as is the letter ‘w’, which was also sometimes used for this sound, causing the final syllable to be confused with ‘’ as a mutated form of Gwen (fair, blessed) a common ending to Welsh names. So ‘’ as a modern Welsh form of the name.  Similarly, the difference between the ‘C’ and the ‘K’ initial consonant is clearly simply a matter of a different spelling convention to represent the hard ‘c’ sound. But the following vowel, ‘y’ or ‘e’ could well represent a shift in actual pronunciation of the vowel sound. 
Sir Ifor Williams  asserted that ‘’ is the most likely original form from ‘’ (bent, angled), so ‘woman with a crooked back’, fitting the stereotype of a witch. Marged Haycock accepts ‘’ but questions the first syllable as ‘cyr’, suggesting other possible alternatives which could relate to ‘’ (shake or shiver), or ‘’ (passionate, fierce, powerful), but also notes her daughter Creirwy, with the first syllable a form of ‘’ (belief) and so, by analogy, her mother’s name as Credidfen would mean ‘woman to be believed in’, making the mother’s and daughter’s name stems a pair.

The earliest poems emphasise her keeping of the cauldron of awen and so a source of poetic inspiration.  Cuhelyn Fardd (1100-1130) spoke of being inspired by her muse, while Cynddelw Prydydd Mawr (1155-1200) acknowledged her as the source of his art and Prydydd y Moch at the beginning of the 13th century specifically mentions the cauldron of Kyridfen as the source of the gift of awen. These and other references by identified bards are in addition to the many references by unidentified bards in The Book of Taliesin.

Legend
This story is first attested in a sixteenth-century manuscript written by Elis Gruffydd who claimed that it was widely known in Wales at that time in both written versions and in oral lore The story tells that Ceridwen's son, Morfran (also called Afagddu), was hideously ugly – particularly compared with his beautiful sister Creirwy – so Ceridwen sought to make him wise in compensation. She made a potion in her magical cauldron to grant the gift of wisdom and poetic inspiration, also called Awen.

The mixture had to be boiled for a year and a day. She set Morda, a blind man, to tend the fire beneath the cauldron, while Gwion Bach, a young boy, stirred the concoction. The first three drops of liquid from this potion gave wisdom; the rest was a fatal poison. Three hot drops spilled onto Gwion's thumb as he stirred, burning him. He instinctively put his thumb in his mouth, and gained the wisdom and knowledge Ceridwen had intended for her son. Realising that Ceridwen would be angry, Gwion fled. Ceridwen chased him. Using the powers of the potion he turned himself into a hare. She became a greyhound. He became a fish and jumped into a river. She transformed into an otter. He turned into a bird; she became a hawk. Finally, he turned into a single grain of corn. She then became a hen and, being a goddess (or enchantress, depending on the version of the tale), she found and ate him without trouble. But because of the potion he was not destroyed. When Ceridwen became pregnant, she knew it was Gwion and resolved to kill the child when he was born. However, when he was born, he was so beautiful that she could not do it. She threw him in the ocean instead, sewing him inside a leather-skin bag (or set him in a coracle, depending on the story). The child did not die, but was rescued on a Welsh shore – near Aberdyfi according to most versions of the tale – by a prince named Elffin ap Gwyddno; the reborn infant grew to become the legendary bard Taliesin.

Later interpretations
It has been suggested that Ceridwen first appeared as a simple sorceress character in the Tale of Taliesin. Its earliest surviving text dates from the mid-16th century, but it appears from its language to be a 9th-century composition, according to Hutton. References to Ceridwen and her cauldron found in the work of the 12th century  or Poets of the Princes (such as Cynddelw Brydydd Mawr) he thus considers later, derivative works. In them, according to Hutton, Ceridwen is transformed from a sorceress into a goddess of poetry. Citing this and a couple of other examples, Hutton proposes that the  substantially created a new mythology not reflective of earlier paganism. Nonetheless, references to Ceridwen's cauldron (pair Ceridwen) are also to be found in some of the early mythological poems attributed to the legendary Taliesin in the Book of Taliesin.

The Victorian poet Thomas Love Peacock also wrote a poem entitled the Cauldron of Ceridwen. Later writers identified her as having originally been a pagan goddess, speculating on her role in a supposed Celtic pantheon. John Rhys in 1878 referred to the Solar Myth theory of Max Müller according to which "Gwenhwyfar and Ceridwen are dawn goddesses." Charles Isaac Elton in 1882 referred to her as a "white fairy". Robert Graves later fitted her into his concept of the Threefold Goddess, in which she was interpreted as a form of the destructive side of the goddess. In Wicca, Ceridwen is a goddess of change and rebirth and transformation and her cauldron symbolizes knowledge and inspiration.

See also
Finn MacCool and the legend of the Salmon of Knowledge
Fáfnismál 
Cottingham, East Riding of Yorkshire which was possibly named after Ceridwen.

References

Welsh mythology
Witches in folklore